The 1869 Maine gubernatorial election was held on September 13, 1869. Republican candidate and war hero Joshua Chamberlain defeated the Democratic candidate Franklin Smith and Prohibition candidate Nathan Griffith Hichborn.

General election

Candidates

Republican 

 Joshua Chamberlain

Democratic 

 Franklin Smith

Prohibition/Temperance 

 Nathan Griffith Hichborn

Results

References 

Maine gubernatorial elections
Maine
1869 Maine elections